Diedrich Diederichsen (born August 15, 1957) is a German author, music journalist and cultural critic. He is an intellectual writer at the crossroads of the arts, politics, and pop culture.

Diedrich Diederichsen was born and grew up in Hamburg where he worked as a music journalist and editor of the German Sounds magazine in the heyday of punk and new wave from 1979 to 1983. Until the 1990s he was then the editor-in-chief of the influential subculture magazine Spex in Cologne. Diederichsen worked as visiting professor in Frankfurt am Main, Stuttgart, Pasadena, Offenbach am Main, Gießen, Weimar, Bremen, Vienna, St. Louis, Cologne, Los Angeles and Gainesville. After teaching at the Merz Academy in Stuttgart for several years, he became Professor for Theory, Practice and Communication of Contemporary Art at the Academy of Fine Arts Vienna in 2006.

Diedrich Diederichsen is a prolific writer whose articles and texts are printed in a variety of periodicals and publications. Newspapers and magazines with contributions by Diedrich Diederichsen include Texte zur Kunst, Die Zeit, die tageszeitung, Der Tagesspiegel, Süddeutsche Zeitung, Theater heute, Artscribe, Artforum, and Frieze.

Diedrich Diederichsen's writing is influenced by Post-structuralism, Marxism, Cultural studies, New Journalism, Beat literature, Psychoanalysis, and Situationism. A main topic of his writing is the tension between subjectivity, identity politics, and culture industry in Post-Fordist society. In his writings he frequently refers to personal experiences and the links between zeitgeist, biography, and history.

Selected works
 Sexbeat (1985), republished 2002
 1500 Schallplatten. 1979–1989 (1989), republished as 2000 Schallplatten. 1979–1999 (2000)
 Freiheit macht arm. Das Leben nach Rock’n’Roll (1993)
 Politische Korrekturen (1996)
 Der lange Weg nach Mitte. Der Sound und die Stadt (1999)
 Musikzimmer. Avantgarde und Alltag (2005)
 Eigenblutdoping. Selbstverwertung, Künstlerromantik, Partizipation (2008)
 Kritik des Auges. Texte zur Kunst (2008)
 On (Surplus) Value in Art. Mehrwert und Kunst. Meerwarde En Kunst (2008)
 The Sopranos (2012)
 Über Pop-Musik (2014)

External links

 Diedrich Diederichsen's homepage at the Academy of Fine Arts Vienna
 Extensive list of published texts
 Interview/podcast with Diedrich Diederichsen (2014) about the role of criticism and creativity in contemporary art, the social dimension and signifying potential of today's music, and the links and differences between the art and music worlds.
 “No Happy End. Narration and Linearity in Kippenberger”, lecture at the Museum of Contemporary Arts (MOCA) during the exhibition Martin Kippenberger: The Problem Perspective, Los Angeles 21 September 2008, webvideo: part 1, part 2, part 3, part 4

1957 births
Living people
German film critics
German music critics
German art critics
German theatre critics
Academic staff of the Academy of Fine Arts Vienna
Journalists from Hamburg
German male non-fiction writers